Santo Santoro (born 27 April 1956) is a former Australian politician and a former deputy leader of the Liberal Party in Queensland. He was a member of the Legislative Assembly of Queensland from 1989 to 2001; and a member of the Australian Senate from 2002 to 2007, representing the state of Queensland. He resigned from John Howard's ministry and from the Senate in the wake of a number of breaches of the Ministerial Code of Conduct and of the Register of Senators' Interests. He now works as a lobbyist.

Early life
Born in Sicily, Italy in 1956, Santoro emigrated to Australia with his family at the age of 5. He was educated at Marist College Rosalie in Brisbane before attending the University of Queensland, where he was awarded the degrees of Bachelor of Arts and Bachelor of Economics with honours.

Queensland state politics
Santoro was elected to the Legislative Assembly of Queensland as Liberal member for Merthyr in Brisbane from 13 May 1989 until 19 September 1992. He was then elected as member for Clayfield from 19 September 1992 until he was defeated on 17 February 2001 by Liddy Clark. From 26 February 1996 to 26 June 1998, he was the State Minister for Training and Industrial Relations.

He was also the deputy leader of the State Liberal Party from 1992 to 1995.

Australian Senate
On 29 October 2002, Santoro was selected by the Queensland Parliament to replace Liberal Party of Australia Senator John Herron, who had resigned from the Senate to become Australia's Ambassador to Ireland.

As a senator, Santoro was a strident critic of the Australian Broadcasting Corporation, using parliamentary privilege in 2003 to accuse the national broadcaster of "sloppy and shoddy" journalism, and disloyalty to Australian soldiers serving in Iraq, after an internal memo to ABC news staff instructed them to refrain from referring to soldiers as "our troops".

Santoro was sworn in as Federal Minister for Ageing in John Howard's government on 27 January 2006.

Share trading scandal and resignation
On 14 March 2007, Senator Santoro disclosed that he had breached the government's ministerial code of conduct by holding shares in CBio, a biotechnology company related to his portfolio. Santoro claimed he had received the shares in January 2006, had failed to declare or divest them when he became Minister for Ageing, until he sold them in January 2007 after realising three months earlier that there might be a conflict of interest. Initially Prime Minister John Howard and other government ministers defended the breach on the grounds that it was inadvertent.

However, further controversy arose over the fate of the profits derived from the sale of the shares in question. Santoro claimed he had donated the proceeds of the sale to a "charity", the Family Council of Queensland. Although this organization is registered as a non-profit entity, it is not registered as a charity.

It was subsequently found during an audit of his finances that Santoro had failed to declare 72 other share trades, and he resigned from the ministry on 16 March 2007 and was replaced as Minister for Ageing by Christopher Pyne. The failures to declare his share trading were in breach of Australian Senate's requirement that Senators' interests be registered, viz: "Any alteration to a senator’s registrable interests, or those of the senator’s spouse or partner, or dependent children, must be notified to the registrar within 35 days of the change occurring."

On 20 March, Santoro announced he would resign from the Senate, and federal politics altogether. This meant that he had served as a Commonwealth Minister without ever facing election. He was replaced in the Senate by Sue Boyce.

Later career
Santo Santoro was federal Liberal Party vice-president until resigning in 2014 when he was forced to choose between that and being a paid lobbyist. He owns Santo Santoro Consulting and is registered as a lobbyist on both the Queensland and federal registers.

References

External links
Senator The Honourable Santo Santoro's Parliamentary Webpage (archived)
Senator Santoro's website (archived)

1956 births
Living people
Liberal Party of Australia members of the Parliament of Queensland
Liberal Party of Australia members of the Parliament of Australia
Members of the Australian Senate
Members of the Australian Senate for Queensland
Members of the Queensland Legislative Assembly
Australian people of Sicilian descent
21st-century Australian politicians